is an Echizen Railway Katsuyama Eiheiji Line train station located in the town of Eiheiji, Yoshida District, Fukui Prefecture, Japan.

Lines

Station layout
The station consists of one side platform serving a single bi-directional track. The station is unattended. There is no station building, but only a shelter on the platform.

Adjacent stations

History
Echizen-Nonaka Station was opened on September 10, 1950. Operations were halted from June 25, 2001. The station reopened on July 20, 2003 as an Echizen Railway station.

Surrounding area
Aside from a few homes nearby the station is surrounded by rice fields.
Fisherman often use this station as an access point to the nearby Kuzuryū River.
  lies to the north.

See also
 List of railway stations in Japan

External links

  

Railway stations in Fukui Prefecture
Railway stations in Japan opened in 1950
Katsuyama Eiheiji Line
Eiheiji, Fukui